Jarred Abiona Ogungbemi-Jackson (born August 11, 1991) is a Canadian-Jamaican professional basketball player for Orléans Loiret of the LNB Pro B.

High school and college career 
Ogungbemi-Jackson played high school basketball for Garden City Collegiate in Winnipeg. He was named Manitoba's most outstanding high school player in Grade 11 and Grade 12. He scored 34 points in the Manitoba province championship game and was named MVP.

He played one season of U Sports basketball for the Calgary Dinos during 2009–10. As the starting point guard, he averaged 10.3 points and led the team in steals with 42.

Professional career
Ogungbemi-Jackson started his career in 2015 with Galitos Barreiro Tley in the Portuguese first-level LPB. He played two seasons in Portugal.

In 2017, he signed in Spain with Força Lleida CE of the LEB Oro.

In the 2018–19 season, he played for AMSB in the French LNB Pro B.

Ogungbemi-Jackson signed with Kataja to play in Finland for the 2019–20 season. The season was cancelled early because of the COVID-19 pandemic.

On May 5, 2020, Ogungbemi-Jackson signed with Donar in the Netherlands for the 2020–21 season. After the regular season, he was named to the All-DBL Team after averaging 17.5 points, 5 rebounds and 3.6 assists per game. He also played two games in the FIBA Europe Cup, averaging 24.0 points in two lost games.

On July 10, 2021, he signed with Danish club Bakken Bears of the Basketligan.

Personal
Ogungbemi-Jackson was born in Winnipeg, Manitoba to James and Sybil, Jamaican and Nigerian parents.

References

1991 births
Living people
Aix Maurienne Savoie Basket players
Basketball players from Winnipeg
Calgary Dinos men's basketball players
Canadian men's basketball players
Donar (basketball club) players
Dutch Basketball League players
Força Lleida CE players
Jamaican men's basketball players
Kataja BC players
Orléans Loiret Basket players
Point guards